Broadminded may refer to:

 Broadminded (radio program), a daily talk and entertainment show on SIRIUS XM
 Broadminded (film), a 1931 American Pre-Code comedy film